Rumana Molla is an American-Belgian actress who is based in Belgium and India and works predominantly in Indian cinema.

Early life and career
Molla was born in West Virginia to Bengali parents and grew up in Brussels, Belgium. She made her Bollywood debut in the movies Ek Villain and Pyaar Ka Punchnama 2. She also starred in Indian web series Dev DD and the sports drama based on cricket Game of the Sexe in 2021.

Molla is also a part of the governance team of the European Haemophilia Consortium.

Filmography

Film

Television

Web series

References

External links

Living people
Actresses from West Virginia
Actresses from Brussels
American emigrants to Belgium
American film actresses
American television actresses
American stage actresses
American actresses of Indian descent
American people of Bengali descent
Belgian film actresses
Belgian television actresses
Belgian stage actresses
Belgian people of Indian descent
Actresses in Hindi cinema
Actresses in Hindi television
Belgian expatriates in India
American expatriate actresses in India
European actresses in India
Year of birth missing (living people)
21st-century Belgian actresses
21st-century American actresses